Voskehat is a village in the Ashtarak Municipality of the Aragatsotn Province of Armenia, located on the right bank of Amberd river, 7 km southwest of the provincial capital Ashtarak. It is surrounded by the villages of Agarak from the north, Voskevaz from the east and Lernamerdz from the south. It has an average elevation of 1025 meters above sea level.

History
The villages was founded in 1829-30 after the Treaty of Turkmenchay. However, the area has been settled by human during the Iron Age based on the remains of a fortress and a settlement found in the village, dating back to the 2nd millennium BC.

The village is also home to the remains of a 14th-century church, as well as the Surp Sarkis fortress dating back to the 17th century.

Economy
The population of Voskehat are mainly involved in cattle-breeding and agriculture, mainly grape and wheat.

The village of Voskehat is home to the "Ashtarak Dzu" poultry farm.

Demographics

References 

Populated places in Aragatsotn Province